Metaphrog are graphic novelists Sandra Marrs and John Chalmers, best known for making the Louis series of comics.

History

Marrs is originally from France, where she studied Arts and Letters. Chalmers is from the west of Scotland and has a scientific background with a PhD in Electronic and Electrical Engineering in Micromachining. Together they live in Glasgow.
In general, Marrs draws the comics while Chalmers writes the scripts. They started their first comic together, Strange Weather Lately, in 1995. The Sunday Herald in Glasgow described Strange Weather Lately as "the existential adventures of Martin Nitram, an unpaid theatre worker engaged in an attempt to mount a cursed play, The Crimes Of Tarquin J Swaffe." (Beadie, Brian (23 May 1999). "Comically graphic tales from the Glasgow underground". The Sunday Herald, p. 7.)

The Strange Weather Lately comics ran for 10 issues until 1999, and were then collected into two graphic novels.

They then moved on to the Louis (graphic novel) series, which includes Louis - Red Letter Day, Louis - Lying To Clive, Louis - The Clown's Last Words, Louis - Dreams Never Die and Louis - Night Salad. In 2011, they redrew and repainted Louis - Red Letter Day and this new version was published in hardback.

Louis - Red Letter Day and Louis - Lying to Clive were also each published as a webcomic on serializer.

Metaphrog were part of a collection of 80 artists from three continents to express their "visions and thoughts on the oft forgotten aspects War" for the book Warburger published by Stripburger in 2003.

Metaphrog teamed up with the UK based record label Fat Cat Records in 2004 to create Louis - Dreams Never Die. For this, musicians hey (from Berlin) and múm (from Iceland) reworked a music track inspired by the Louis books, and Metaphrog made a short animation. The result was a multimedia project with a graphic novel and cd/blue vinyl 7".

They have been commissioned to work on several projects, including an adaptation of the poem The First Men on Mercury by Edwin Morgan (poet) in comic form. On National Poetry Day 2009, 35000 copies of the pamphlet published by the Association for Scottish Literary Studieswere distributed to all Glasgow Secondary Schools. Other commissioned works include: Skint! for the Scottish Book Trust in 2010 and, in revised form, in 2014; The Photographs for Glasgow Life and Time to Shine: graphic novel for Creative Scotland in 2013.

Their work has been exhibited at The British Library, The London Print Studio, The Lakes International Comic Art Festival, The National Library of Scotland, Scotland House in Brussels and Dundee University. The duo travel extensively across the country to promote the medium of comics, visiting schools, libraries, museums, festivals, sharing their experience of making comics. They have given talks at Gordonstoun school, Glasgow School of Art, and visited international school in Europe.

In 2015 Papercutz published The Red Shoes and Other Tales a collection of graphic fairy tales adapted from Hans Christian Andersen along with The Glass Case an original short story. This collection was followed by an adaptation of The Little Mermaid in 2017.

Metaphrog are Patrons of Reading 2013-2017 at Northfield Academy in Aberdeen and were Writers in Residence at the Edinburgh International Book Festival 2015. They are the winners of The Sunday Herald Scottish Culture Awards Best Visual Artist 2016.

Bibliography

Graphic novels
Strange Weather Lately:
 Vol. One (1998)
 Vol. Two (1999)
Louis:
 Red Letter Day (2000)
 Lying to Clive (2001)
 The Clown's Last Words (2002)
 Dreams Never Die (Fat Cat Records, 2004)
 Night Salad (2010)
 Red Letter Day new edition (2011)
 The Red Shoes and Other Tales (Papercutz, 2015)
 The Little Mermaid (Papercutz, 2017)

Comics
 Strange Weather Lately #1 - #10 (1996–1999)
 The Maze Part One and Part Two (1997)
 Vermin (1999)

Short stories
 9/11 Emergency Relief, Alternative Press (US - 2002)
 Alan Moore: Portrait of an Extraordinary Gentleman, Abiogenesis Press (UK - 2003)
 Warburger, Stripburger (Slovenia - 2003)
 SPX Anthology (US - 2003)
 Autobiographix, Dark Horse (US - 2003), Ediciones Glenat (Spain - 2005) and Kappa Edizioni (Italy - 2005)
 Variant (Winter 2004)
 The Big Issue in Scotland (Xmas Special 2005)
 Variant cover art + illustrated story (Winter 2006)
 New Writing Scotland 30 (2012)

Webcomics
Louis: Red Letter Day, on serializer (2003–2004)
Louis: Lying to Clive, on serializer (2006-2007)

Animation
Louis - Dreams Never Die (2004)

Awards
 2000: Eisner Award nominations, "Best Title for a Younger Audience", "Best Graphic Album - New", Louis - Red Letter Day 
 2001: Ignatz Award nomination, "Promising New Talent", Louis - Red Letter Day 
 2011: Eisner Award nomination, "Best Coloring", Louis - Night Salad 
 2011: Highly Commended for the Scottish Children's Book Awards
 2011: Shortlisted for the Leeds Graphic Novel Awards
 2011: Long listed for the YALSA Great Graphic Novels for Teens
 2016: Winners of The Sunday Herald Scottish Culture Awards Best Visual Artist

See also

 List of magazines published in Scotland

References
 Beadie, Brian (23 May 1999). "Comically graphic tales from the Glasgow underground". The Sunday Herald, p. 7.
 Teddy Jamieson (16 April 2017)"'Stories will be our salvation: Glasgwegian cartoonists Metaphrog on the art of story and the story of their art" http://www.heraldscotland.com/arts_ents/visual/15227210._Stories_will_be_our_salvation___Glasgwegian_cartoonists_Metaphrog_on_the_art_of_story_and_the_story_of_their_art/ 
 Burchill, Julie (23 August 2003). " THE GRAPHIC TRUTH". The Guardian https://www.theguardian.com/lifeandstyle/2003/aug/23/weekend.julieburchill
 Mann, Natasha (20 November 1999). "Who to Watch: Sandra Marrs and John Chalmers". The Scotsman, p. 5. https://web.archive.org/web/20181120123123/https://www.highbeam.com/doc/1P2-18711513.html
 Szadkowski, Joseph (17 August 2002). "Books that give color to mankind's darker side". The Washington Times, p. B2.
 Wild, Abigail (18 September 2004). "Punks of publishing; Their comic books have become cult hits". The Herald (Glasgow), p. 3.
 The Bookseller (18 July 2016) Graphic novel-writing pair crowned Sunday Herald's best visual artists http://www.thebookseller.com/news/graphic-novels-surge-metaphrog-crowned-sunday-heralds-best-visual-artists-353891
 Paul Gravett, Graphic Novels, Stories to change your life, Aurum
 Steven Withrow and Alexander Danner (2007), Character Design for Graphic Novels, Focal Press/Rotovision

External links
 Official metaphrog website.
 metaphrog blog.

Sources 

 Stories will be our salvation: Glasgwegian cartoonists Metaphrog on the art of story and the story of their art , The Sunday Herald, Teddy Jamieson, 16 April 2017
 THE GRAPHIC TRUTH, The Guardian, Julie Burchill, 23 August 2003
 Who to Watch: Sandra Marrs and John Chalmers, The Scotsman, Natasha Mann, 20 November 1999
 "Books that give color to mankind's darker side", The Washington Times, Joseph Szadkowski, 17 August 2002

 
 Outlander star Sam Heughan and Game of Thrones actor Kate Dickie on red carpet at inaugural Sunday Herald Culture Awards, The Herald, Judith Duffy, 10 July 2016 
 The Metaphrog Interview, The Comics Journal, Gavin Lees, 28 September 2011
 Graphic novel-writing pair crowned Sunday Herald's best visual artists, The Bookseller, 13 July 2016 
 
 Metaphrog on graphic novels and the creative process, Creative Scotland, 12 November 2014
 Catching up with Metaphrog, Creative Scotland, 28 October 2015
 Favourite book festival moments: Metaphrog, The Guardian, 28 August 2011  

British graphic novelists
French comics artists
Scottish comics artists
British female comics artists
Female comics writers
Living people
1965 births
1973 births
Scottish comics writers
Art duos
Writing duos